Castlemead is the second tallest high-rise building in Bristol, England, after Castle Park View topped out in 2020.  Designed by A.J. Hines and started in 1973, work was halted by a recession in the property market and it was completed in 1981.  The building has a roof height of 80 metres or 262 feet and consists of 18 floors, 17 of which are offices.
Castlemead is owned by Regional Properties Ltd and managed by Knight Frank LLP.

In June 2021, a major £2.1 million refurbishment completed. This included upgrading all 18 floors up to Grade A standard and transforming the basement to facilitate the creation of 374 new bike spaces, together with cycle hire facilities, 18 new showers, storage lockers, large dedicated drying room, new secure access with lift and 12 electric car charging points.

The building is a short walk from Castle Park and the River Avon, and the Cabot Circus and Broadmead shopping areas.

Companies contained within the building include: IMDb, Beaufort Securities Stockbrokers, IBEX Global UK, Marsh Commercial, Equiniti, Bristol IT Company and MWB Business Exchange.
The building is also used by organisations including Lloyds TSB, and the City of Bristol College for holding exams.

See also
List of tallest buildings and structures in Bristol

References

External links
Official website

Buildings and structures in Bristol
Buildings and structures completed in 1981